Nazarovo is a town in Krasnoyarsk Krai, Russia, located on the left bank of the Chulym River (an Ob River tributary),  west of Krasnoyarsk. Population:

History
The selo of Nazarovo was founded in 1700 by Nazary Patyukov, a Cossack, and was named after him. In 1888, deposits of brown coal were discovered in the vicinity of the village, and in 1925 a railroad was built through it. The selo was granted urban-type settlement status in 1946 and town status in 1961.

Administrative and municipal status
Within the framework of administrative divisions, Nazarovo serves as the administrative center of Nazarovsky District, even though it is not a part of it. As an administrative division, it is incorporated separately as the krai town of Nazarovo—an administrative unit with the status equal to that of the districts. As a municipal division, the krai town of Nazarovo is incorporated as Nazarovo Urban Okrug.

References

Notes

Sources

Cities and towns in Krasnoyarsk Krai
Yeniseysk Governorate
Populated places established in 1700
1700 establishments in Russia